The Santa Massacre was a massacre of nine campesinos carried out by Grupo Colina in the Santa Province of the Ancash Region of Peru. The massacre occurred on May 2, 1992.

Carlos Alberto Barrientos Velásquez, Roberto Barrientos Velásquez, Denis Atilio Castillo Chávez, Federico Coquis Velásquez, Gilmer Ramiro León Velásquez, Pedro Pablo López Gonzáles, Jesús Manfredo Noriega Ríos, Carlos Martín Tarazona More, and Jorge Luis Tarazona More all died in the massacre.

After carrying out the massacre, members of Grupo Colina, a death squad operating out of the Army of Peru, painted pro-Shining Path graffiti as a false flag operation. All of the members of Grupo Colina have since been jailed.

The victims of the massacre were finally exhumed and identified in August 2011 and reburied in late November of the same year with the Peruvian government formally apologizing to the relatives of the victims in name of the state.

See also
List of massacres in Peru

References

External links
 APRODEH. The Santa Case.
  Comisión de la Verdad y Reconciliación Nacional.  .

Massacres in 1992
Internal conflict in Peru
Massacres in Peru
Anti-communist terrorism
Political repression in Peru
Deaths by firearm in Peru
1992 in Peru
1992 murders in Peru
History of Ancash Region